The Bull Inn, also known as The Bull at Sonning or just The Bull, is an historic public house — now also a restaurant and hotel — in the centre of the village of Sonning in Berkshire, England.

Overview
Traditionally, the Bull was owned by the Bishop of Salisbury, whose palace once stood nearby. Today it is owned by St Andrew's Church who currently rent it to Fullers  The present 16th century timber-framed building, it is suggested, was a hospitium for pilgrims visiting the relics of the mysterious St Sarik at the adjoining St Andrew's Church. The name stems from bulls which supported the coat of arms of Sir Henry Neville. He was steward at the palace after it was sold to Queen Elizabeth I.

The inn was featured in Jerome K. Jerome's book Three Men in a Boat:

The two storey timber-framed building dates from the late 16th century with 19th/20th century additions. It was Grade II* listed in 1967.
Opposite is a well-hidden Lutyens-designed house, Deanery Garden.

Customers have included the American film star George Clooney and his British wife, the human rights lawyer Amal Clooney, who purchased the Mill House in Sonning Eye, just over the River Thames from Sonning, in 2014.

See also
 Great House at Sonning
 Sonning Bishop's Palace
 The Barley Mow, Clifton Hampden, also mentioned in Three Men in a Boat

References

External links
 
 Royal Berkshire History: Sonning

Grade II* listed pubs in Berkshire
Sonning
Timber framed buildings in England